Gorzów may refer to the following places in Poland:

Gorzów Wielkopolski, a city in Lubusz Voivodeship (west Poland)
Gorzów Śląski, a town in Opole Voivodeship (south-west Poland)
Gorzów, Lesser Poland Voivodeship (south Poland)
Gorzów Voivodeship, a former voivodeship (1975-1998) of Poland